Anike Agbaje-Williams (née Kuforiji)  is one of Nigeria's pioneer newsreaders. She was the first female television staff announcer and broadcaster in Nigeria.

Life
Agbaje-Williams was born in Abeokuta on the 23rd of October, 1936. She was the third daughter born to Mr. and Mrs. Kuforiji, her father was of Egba heritage. She spent her primary school and junior secondary school years in Lagos under the care of her guardian, Mrs Gbemisola Rosiji, wife of Ayo Rosiji and Bishop and Mrs S.C. Philips. She attended CMS Girls School, Lagos. In 1950, when CMS Girls School was relocated to Ibadan and renamed St Anne's School, she moved with the school and finished her education in Ibadan.

After completing secondary school education, she got employment with the Nigerian Broadcasting Corporation at Ikoyi, Lagos in 1955. Abgaje-Williams' career as a newsreader began as a result of co-worker not showing up to work. On that day, a colleague who usually does announcements or reading small bits of information on the radio did not show up, the current host then asked her to take his place. Agbaje-Williams read the information and when the supervisor heard her voice, he was impressed, she was then asked to join the programmes department as a staff announcer.

When a television station was established at Ibadan, she was asked to interview and was subsequently given a job at the station. Agbaje-Williams was a pioneer staff of WNTV, which was first television station in Nigeria, she was also the first female broadcaster of the station. She rose to become a producer and director of programmes at the television station before retiring in 1986.

References

Nigerian women journalists
Nigerian broadcasters
People from Abeokuta
History of women in Nigeria
1936 births
Living people
Nigerian television personalities
Television personalities from Lagos
20th-century Nigerian women
21st-century Nigerian women
St Anne's School, Ibadan alumni